The French destroyer Le Flibustier was one of a dozen s built for the French Navy during the late 1930s. Still incomplete when the French signed an armistice to end the Battle of France, material shortages prevented her completion and she was placed in reserve. The ship was renamed Bison in early 1941. When the Germans occupied Vichy France after the Allies landed in French North Africa in November 1942 and tried to seize the French fleet intact, the destroyer was one of the few ships not scuttled to prevent their capture. The ship was salvaged in 1945 and later scrapped.

Design and description
They were powered by two geared steam turbines, each driving one propeller shaft, using steam provided by four Sural-Penhöet forced-circulation boilers. The crew consisted of 10 officers and 177 enlisted men.

The main armament of the Le Hardi-class ships consisted of six Canon de 130 mm Modèle 1932 guns in three twin mounts, one forward and a superfiring pair aft of the superstructure. Their anti-aircraft (AA) armament consisted of one twin mount for  guns and two twin Hotchkiss  AA machine gun mounts. The ships carried one triple and two twin sets of  torpedo tubes, all above-water. A pair of chutes were built into the stern that housed a dozen  depth charges.

Construction and career
Ordered on 24 May 1937, Le Flibuster was built by Forges et Chantiers de la Méditerranée at their shipyard in La Seyne-sur-Mer. She was laid down on 11 March 1938 and launched on 19 December 1939. The ship remained at Toulon after the French surrendered on 22 June 1940 and began her trials the following day, although she still lacked her armament. She was then reduced to reserve. On 1 April 1941, Le Flibuster was renamed Bison to commemorate the large destroyer of that name that was sunk during the Norwegian Campaign of 1940.

Unlike most of the ships in Toulon, Bison was undamaged when the Germans attempted to capture the French ships there on 27 November 1942 because she was still in reserve and did not have any crew assigned to scuttle her. The Italians rejected a German request to complete her and redesignated her as FR35. After the Italian armistice in September, she was used as a smoke-generator hulk by the Germans. She was first damaged during an Allied air raid in early 1944 and then by a collision with a German submarine on 25 June. The ship sank in the commercial port of Brégaillon-Toulon; she was refloated the following year and scrapped.

Notes

References

 

Le Hardi-class destroyers
Naval ships of France captured by Italy during World War II
1939 ships